Prosphaerosyllis is a genus of polychaetes belonging to the family Syllidae.

The genus has cosmopolitan distribution.

Species:

Prosphaerosyllis adelae 
Prosphaerosyllis battiri 
Prosphaerosyllis bilineata 
Prosphaerosyllis brachycephala 
Prosphaerosyllis brandhorsti 
Prosphaerosyllis brevicirra 
Prosphaerosyllis campoyi 
Prosphaerosyllis chauseyensis 
Prosphaerosyllis danovaroi 
Prosphaerosyllis fujianensis 
Prosphaerosyllis giandoi 
Prosphaerosyllis isabellae 
Prosphaerosyllis kerguelensis 
Prosphaerosyllis laubieri 
Prosphaerosyllis longicauda 
Prosphaerosyllis longipapillata 
Prosphaerosyllis magnoculata 
Prosphaerosyllis marmarae 
Prosphaerosyllis modinouae 
Prosphaerosyllis multipapillata 
Prosphaerosyllis nathani 
Prosphaerosyllis opisthoculata 
Prosphaerosyllis palpopapillata 
Prosphaerosyllis papillosissima 
Prosphaerosyllis semiverrucosa 
Prosphaerosyllis sotoi 
Prosphaerosyllis sublaevis 
Prosphaerosyllis tetralix 
Prosphaerosyllis xarifae

References

Annelids